Acrocercops apicepunctella is a moth of the family Gracillariidae, known from Saint Vincent and the Grenadines. It was named by Thomas de Grey, 6th Baron Walsingham in 1891.

References

apicepunctella
Moths of the Caribbean
Moths described in 1891